Barcelona Gold is a compilation album that was released to coincide with the 1992 Summer Olympics in Barcelona, Spain. The album reached number 32 on the US Billboard 200.

Track listing
"Barcelona" – Freddie Mercury and Montserrat Caballé	
"One Song" – Tevin Campbell
"How Fast, How Far" – Anita Baker
"Higher Baby" – DJ Jazzy Jeff & The Fresh Prince
"Keep It Comin'" – Keith Sweat
"Free Your Mind" – En Vogue
"Don't Tread on Me" – Damn Yankees
"Not Enough Time" – INXS
"Go Out Dancing" – Rod Stewart
"Texas Flyer" – Travis Tritt
"The Heart to Climb the Mountain" – Randy Travis
"Old Soldier" – Marc Cohn
"This Used to Be My Playground" – Madonna
"No Sé Tú" – Luis Miguel
"Wonderful Tonight" – Eric Clapton
"Love Is Here to Stay" – Natalie Cole
"Amigos Para Siempre (Friends for Life)" – Sarah Brightman and José Carreras

Notes
Some versions of the album omit "Not Enough Time" by INXS.
"Free Your Mind" by En Vogue is an alternative version with altered lyrics.
"Wonderful Tonight" by Eric Clapton is a live version.

References

External links
Barcelona Gold at Discogs

1992 compilation albums
Olympic albums
Warner Records albums
1992 Summer Olympics